The 316th Troop Carrier Squadron is an inactive unit of the United States Air Force.  Its last assignment was with the 436th Troop Carrier Group, stationed at Godman Field, Kentucky.  It was inactivated on 27 June 1949.

Overview
The unit was active during World War II and the immediate postwar years.  Its mission was aerial transportation in the Hawaiian Islands and to forward bases in the Pacific.  It later was active in the Air Force Reserve.

History

Lineage
 Constituted 316th Troop Carrier Squadron on 7 December 1943
 Activated on 15 December 1943
 Inactivated on 25 March 1946
 Activated in the reserve on 15 March 1947
 Inactivated on 27 June 1949.

Assignments
 I Troop Carrier Command, 15 December 1943
 Attached to: 61st Troop Carrier Wing, 15 December 1943
 Attached to: 1st Provisional Troop Carrier Group, February-30 September 1944
 VI Air Service Area Command, 4 November 1944
 Seventh Air Force, 22 July 1945
 Eighth Air Force, 1 September 1945
 54th Troop Carrier Wing, 15 February-25 March 1946
 436th Troop Carrier Group, 15 March 1947 – 27 June 1949.

Stations
 Sedalia Army Air Field, Missouri, 15 December 1943
 Alliance Army Air Field, Nebraska 25 January 1944
 Camp Mackall, North Carolina, to March-30 September 1944
 Kahuku AAB, Hawaii (Territory), 4 November 1944
 Bellows Field, Hawaii (Territory), 16 February 1945
 Kadena Airfield, Okinawa, 22 August 1945 – 25 March 1946
 Godman Field, Kentucky, 15 March 1947 – 27 June 1949.

Aircraft
 C-47 Skytrain, 1944–1945
 C-46 Commando, 1945-1946.

References

External links

Troop carrier squadrons of the United States Air Force
Troop carrier squadrons of the United States Army Air Forces
1943 establishments in Missouri
1949 disestablishments in Kentucky